Denis Charles Betts (born 14 September 1969) is an English rugby league coach and former player. He was assistant coach of the England national team.

A , Betts played in the 1980s, 1990s and 2000s for the Wigan Warriors, with whom he won numerous titles, and for the Auckland Warriors. He won four caps for England and 32 for Great Britain, setting a record for a forward. He played in two Rugby League World Cups, in 1989-92 and 1995, including playing in the finals of both.

Early life
Betts was born on 14 September 1969 in Salford, Lancashire and attended Clarendon High School. He has a younger brother, Darren Betts – also a talented rugby and footballer who played for Salford in the 1990s. Betts was himself a former Manchester United youth team player.

Betts signed for Wigan from Leigh Miners ARL (also known as Leigh Rangers) on 14 October 1986.

Playing career
Betts was a part of the hugely successful Wigan team of the 1980s, and 90's, his own medal haul including six Championships, seven Rugby League Challenge Cups, three Premierships, four John Player/Regal Trophies, and two Lancashire County Cup. He also received the Lance Todd Trophy (1991) and the coveted Man of Steel Award (1995). He featured in three World Club Challenge matches for Wigan, winning two, against Penrith Panthers in 1991 and Brisbane Broncos in 1994.

In 1995, at the height of the Super League War he signed a lucrative deal with the Auckland Warriors, one of the new clubs, coached by former Wigan coach John Monie.

Later that year Betts became the first player to win both England and Great Britain caps while not playing in the English leagues. With former Wigan team-mate Shaun Edwards ruled out by injury, Betts captained England from the second row in the 1995 Rugby League World Cup Final at Wembley Stadium, but Australia won the match 16–8 and retained the World Cup. Betts' selection as captain of England meant he was the first player given the honour while not playing in the English leagues.

During the 1996 Auckland Warriors season Betts captained the club. The 1997 season was Betts' last with the Auckland Warriors as he returned to England to continue playing for Wigan.

Betts returned to play in the 1998 Wigan Warriors season in Europe's Super League competition, and played in the side which lost the 1998 Challenge Cup Final to Sheffield Eagles. He missed Wigan's 1998 Super League Grand Final victory that year through injury. Betts scored Wigan's opening try in the last game at Central Park, and their first try at the JJB Stadium.

At the end of 1999's Super League IV, Betts was selected to play for Great Britain in the 1999 Tri-Nations tournament in both of their matches against New Zealand and Australia.

Betts played for Wigan in their 2000 Super League Grand Final loss to St. Helens, and their 2001 Grand Final loss to the Bradford Bulls. He was persuaded to retire from playing at the age of 32, to help Wigan get under the salary cap.

In total, Betts made 32 appearances for Great Britain, the joint highest ever for a forward, and toured three times, in 1990, 1992 and 1996. He also captained England in the 1995 World Cup Final, which they lost to Australia at Wembley in front of 66,540 fans.

Coaching career
At the end of 2001, Betts moved into coaching as Under-18s coach at the Wigan Warriors, and progressed to under-21s, which he led to victory in the 2003 U21 Grand Final. In July 2003, Stuart Raper was sacked as the Wigan Warriors coach, and he was replaced by Mike Gregory. Gregory then appointed Betts as his assistant. the Wigan Warriors' results improved and they went on reach the Grand Final, only to lose to Bradford Bulls. The following season, the Wigan Warriors reached another final, losing this time to St. Helens in the Challenge Cup Final. Betts then took temporary charge in May 2004 when Gregory stepped down due to illness. He held the position for a year before he was moved sideways by the club to make way for the appointment of new head coach Ian Millward, who had left St. Helens just two weeks earlier and was recruited for his experience. Betts continued to work under Millward until the end of the 2005's Super League X but left in November after refusing to take a post as coach of the academy Under-21 team.

In January 2006 he took up a post as skills and development coach with Guinness Premiership rugby union club Gloucester, a position which he left during June 2010, despite having another year on his contract. Speaking about his time at Gloucester, he said "It's a really passionate place and I hope they can get the success they deserve. I really enjoyed the place, especially the match-day atmosphere and the Shed."

While at Gloucester, Betts emerged as a surprise contender for the vacant England coaching job, which he applied for in March 2010, ultimately losing out to Bradford Bulls' Steve McNamara.

In November 2010, Betts was appointed coach of Championship club; the Widnes Vikings. In May 2011, he was reappointed to manage the Widnes Vikings into the Super League in 2012.

Betts was appointed assistant coach to Wayne Bennett with England in April 2016. England finished third in the 2016 Four Nations, and were runners-up in the 2017 World Cup.

In May 2018 the Widnes Vikings terminated Betts' contract with immediate effect. Due to the Widnes Vikings poor run with winning only three games out of twelve.

References

External links
Denis Betts Wigan Playing Career Page on the Wigan RL Fansite.
Denis Betts Wigan Coaching Career Page on the Wigan RL Fansite.
(archived by web.archive.org) When Britain defeated the Aussies

1969 births
Living people
England national rugby league team captains
England national rugby league team players
English rugby league coaches
English rugby league players
Great Britain national rugby league team players
Great Britain under-21 national rugby league team players
Lance Todd Trophy winners
New Zealand Warriors captains
New Zealand Warriors players
Newcastle Thunder coaches
Rugby league players from Salford
Rugby league second-rows
Widnes Vikings coaches
Wigan Warriors coaches
Wigan Warriors players